Bernat Solà Pujol (born 5 September 1965 in Mataró) is a Spanish former ski jumper.

Solà has competed in the 1984 and 1988 Winter Olympics, the 1985, 1987 and 1989 FIS Nordic World Ski Championships and 1990 Ski Flying World Championships. He is also holding the national record with 141.0 meters at Tauplitz in 1986.

At the World Cup his personal best is 14th place in Sapporo during the 1986–87 season. This was also his only points he scored in the World Cup.

References

External links 
 
 

Spanish male ski jumpers
Olympic ski jumpers of Spain
Ski jumpers at the 1984 Winter Olympics
Ski jumpers at the 1988 Winter Olympics
1965 births
Living people